Cymothoe jodutta, the jodutta glider, is a butterfly in the family Nymphalidae. It is found in Guinea, Sierra Leone, Liberia, Ivory Coast, Ghana, Nigeria, Cameroon, Gabon, the Republic of the Congo, the Central African Republic, the Democratic Republic of the Congo and Uganda. The habitat consists of wet forests.

The larvae feed on Caloncoba species.

Subspecies
Cymothoe jodutta jodutta (Guinea, Sierra Leone, Liberia, Ivory Coast, Ghana) 
Cymothoe jodutta ciceronis (Ward, 1871) (Nigeria: east of Niger, Cameroon, Gabon, Congo, Central African Republic, Democratic Republic of the Congo: Mayumbe)
Cymothoe jodutta ehmckei Dewitz, 1887 (Democratic Republic of the Congo: Tshuapa, Mai-Ndombe, Kinshasa, Kwango, Kasai, Sankuru)
Cymothoe jodutta mostinckxi Overlaet, 1952 (Uganda: west to the Bwamba Valley, Democratic Republic of the Congo: Ubangi, Mongala, Uele, Ituri, Kivu and Tshopo)

References

Butterflies described in 1850
Cymothoe (butterfly)